Oidium may refer to:

Oidium (genus), a genus of fungi in the family Erysiphaceae
Oidium (spore), a type of fungal spore
Oidium, a disease of grapes caused by the fungus species Uncinula necator (syn. Oidium tuckeri)